The 2023 Formula Regional Japanese Championship will be a multi-event, Formula Regional open-wheel single seater motor racing championship held in Japan. The drivers will compete in Formula Regional cars that conform to the FIA Formula Regional regulations for the championship. This will be the fourth season of the series, promoted by K2 Planet, and the 45th overall season of an FIA ladder series (dating to the 1979 Japanese Formula 3 Championship).

The season is scheduled to start on 1 April at Fuji Speedway and will run over six weekends, until 26 November.

Teams and drivers 
All teams and drivers will compete using the Dome F111/3 Regional F3 car. All teams are Japanese-registered.

Race calendar 
The 2023 calendar was revealed in late 2022.

References

External links 

 

Formula Regional Japanese Championship
FRJC
Formula Regional
Formula Regional Japan